Crinum pedunculatum  also known as the swamp lily, river lily or mangrove lily,  is a bulbous perennial found in stream and tidal areas of the Northern Territory, Queensland and New South Wales, Australia as well as New Guinea and some Pacific Islands. It is unclear whether it is native or introduced to Norfolk Island.

C. pedunculatum is considered by some sources to be a synonym of Crinum asiaticum var. pedunculatum. The differences between C. asiaticum and C. pedunculatum are subtle. The latter tends to be somewhat smaller, but has broader petals, giving it a less fragile appearance.

It is a very large bulbous perennial plant, up to 2 to 3 metres tall, with a spread of up to 3 metres. It likes either full sun or partial shade. It is usually found on the edge of forests, but also at the high tide level close to mangroves.

The white, fragrant flowers are in a cluster with 10 to 100 flowers on an umbel.

Cultivation and uses
C. pedunculatum makes a beautiful feature plant in a large garden. It prefers a fairly well shaded position. It is a good container plant if kept well-watered. The sap has been used as a treatment for box jellyfish stings.

Propagation

The flowers produce a small bulb, or the larger bulbs in the ground may be transplanted.

Gallery

See also
 List of plants known as lily

References
 Beasley, John. 2006. Plants of Tropical North Queensland: the Compact Guide. Footloose Publications, Kuranda. .
 Fay, Michael F. and Mark W. Chase. "Resurrection of Themidaceae for the Brodiaea alliance, and Recircumscription of Alliaceae, Amaryllidaceae and Agapanthoideae." Taxon, Vol. 45, No. 3. (Aug., 1996), pp. 441–451.
 Scarth-Johnson, Vera. 2000. National Treasures: Flowering Plants of Cooktown and Northern Australia. Vera Scarth-Johnson Gallery Association.  (pbk.)  Limited  Edition - Leather Bound.

External links
 
 
 Association of Societies for Growing Australian Plants:Crinum pedunculatum

pedunculatum
Flora of New South Wales
Flora of Queensland
Flora of New Guinea
Asparagales of Australia
Taxa named by Robert Brown (botanist, born 1773)